Luzern Bahnhofquai is a quay and shipping terminal in the city of Lucerne, in Switzerland. It is located at the northwest corner of Lake Lucerne, where the river Reuss leaves the lake and flows north toward the Aare. It is served by the Lake Lucerne Navigation Company. The terminal is located across the Bahnhofplatz from Lucerne's primary railway station.

Layout 
Directly south on the Bahnhofplatz are the bus bays of the Lucerne railway station, followed by the station building itself.

Services 
 the following services stop at Luzern Bahnhofquai:

 Lake Lucerne Navigation Company:
 hourly service to Brunnen; some ships continue from Brunnen to Flüelen.
 during the summer months, five round-trips per day to Alpnachstad
 during the summer months, three round-trips per day to Küssnacht am Rigi
 during the summer months, three round-trips per day to Meggenhorn

Between April and mid October, the daily Gotthard Panorama Express connects the Bahnhofquai with Lugano once a day by boat and train, travelling by boat along the length of Lake Lucerne to Flüelen, and then by train over the historic high-level Gotthard route.

References

External links 
 
 

Ferry terminals in Switzerland
Transport in Lucerne